Plaza Mayor may refer to:

 Plaza mayor (urban design), in Spanish-speaking countries, a major city square
 Plaza Mayor, Madrid, a plaza in the centre of Madrid, Spain
 Plaza Mayor, Valladolid, a plaza in the centre of Valladolid, Spain
 Plaza Mayor, Salamanca, a plaza in the centre of Salamanca, Spain
 Plaza Mayor, Lima, a plaza in the centre of Lima, Perú
 Plaza de Roma, a plaza in the centre of Manila, Philippines.
 Plaza Mayor, Trinidad, Cuba, a plaza in the center of Trinidad, Cuba
 Plaza Mayor, Medellín, a conventions center in Medellín, Colombia
 Plaza Mayor (Oklahoma), formerly Crossroads Mall, a mall in Oklahoma City, Oklahoma

es:Plaza Mayor
fr:Plaza Mayor
sv:Plaza de Armas